Group 2 of the 1978 FIFA World Cup was one of four groups of nations competing at the 1978 FIFA World Cup. The group consisted of Poland, West Germany, Tunisia and Mexico.

Standings

Matches

West Germany vs Poland

Tunisia vs Mexico

West Germany vs Mexico

Poland vs Tunisia

West Germany vs Tunisia

Poland vs Mexico

References

Groups
G
Poland at the 1978 FIFA World Cup
Group
Tunisia at the 1978 FIFA World Cup